The Smoky Group is a stratigraphical unit of Late Cretaceous age in the Western Canadian Sedimentary Basin. 

It takes the name from the Smoky River, and was first described in outcrops along the banks of the Smoky River, Spirit River and Pouce Coupe Rivers by George Mercer Dawson in 1881.

Lithology
The Smoky Group is represented by marine silty shale with ironstone and bentonite streaks. Sandstone occurs at the base, and is transitional to the Dunvegan Formation.

Hydrocarbon production

Gas is produced from the Cardium Formation in the southern reaches of the Group, in central Alberta and northern Alberta.

Distribution
The Kaskapau Shale reaches 477m in the Pouce Coupe River area and thins towards the east in the Smoky River area. The Bad Heart Formation sandstone is up to 8m thick, while the Puskwaskau Formation ranges from 200m in the Pouce Coupe Prairie to 123m in the Spirit River area.

Relationship to other units
The  Smoky Group is conformably and transgressively followed by the Wapiti Group and rests conformably on the Dunvegan Formation sandstone. The Cardium sandstone and Muskiki shale are replacing the upper parts of the Kaskapau Formation in the south-east of the distribution area. The entire group correlates with the Blackstone Formation, Cardium Formation and Wapiabi Formation of the Alberta Group in the southern foothills. The equivalent stratigraphic sequence in central Alberta consists of the Lea Park Formation and the upper Colorado Group, in north-eastern Alberta it correlates with Labiche Formation, and with the Kotaneelee Formation in the Liard River area.

Subdivisions
The Smoky Group has the following sub-divisions from top to bottom:

The Kaskapau Formation is equivalent to the sum of  Blackstone Formation, Cardium Formation and Muskiki Formation.

References

Stratigraphy of Alberta
Stratigraphy of British Columbia
Cretaceous Alberta
Cretaceous British Columbia